An oscillistor is a semiconductor device, consisting of a semiconductor specimen placed in magnetic field, and a resistor after a power supply. The device produces high-frequency oscillations, which are very close to sinusoidal. 

The basic principle of operation is the effect of spiral unsteadiness of electron-hole (p-n) plasmas.

See also
Electronic oscillator

References 
 Larrabee R.D., Steel M.C.  "Oscillistor — New type of semiconductor oscillator", J. Appl. Phys. v.31, N.9 p.1519–1523 (1960). 

Electronic oscillators
Semiconductor devices